Greetings from Out Here is a  1993 road trip documentary film which captures the people, places and politics of gay America in the Deep South.

It was the first Independent Television Service (ITVS) program to be broadcast nationally. It received an invitation to the Sundance Film Festival and was acquired for international broadcasts by the BBC, Channel Four, and the Canadian Broadcasting Company.

Synopsis
On her journey, filmmaker Ellen Spiro visits memorable landmarks, events and characters, including Mardi Gras, Gay Pride in Atlanta,  the Gay rodeo, Dollywood, Miss Miller's Eternal Love and Care Pet Cemetery, and the Short Mountain Radical Faerie sanctuary.

Interviews with gay men and lesbians throughout the film demonstrate the wide range of Southern lives, from  Rita, a retired military officer, now a drag queen in New Orleans, to Iris, a black lesbian living in a bus in the Ozarks.

The subjects in Greetings From Out Here address the impact of AIDS in the rural South, the politics of being gay in the South, and the relationship between the gay and civil rights movements.

Reviews
"A wise-cracking, determinedly anti-mythic video artist with a gift  for finding community wherever she turns, Spiro defines the roadmovie on her own terms in an exhilarating new work. Her curious, wry, observant, and admirably uninvasive way of shooting conveys a vital feeling of identification with her subjects." 
                                            – Linda Dubler, Video Curator, High Museum of Art, Atlanta

"Lacing the work with irony, humor, and defiance, and a touch of pain and bitterness, [Spiro] ties together isolated people through their common identity and a strong sense of place that ranks this among the finest road documentaries and ethnographic films." – Rob Nixon, ETC. MAGAZINE

Awards 
Documentary Achievement Award, American Motion Picture Society (1995)
Jury Award, New York Expo of Film and Video (1995)
First Prize, Non-fiction, USA Film Festival (1994)
Golden Gate Award, Best Television Documentary, San Francisco International Film Festival (1994)
Best Documentary Award, Atlanta Film and Video Festival (1994)
Paul Clere Humanitarian Award of Excellence, Sinking Creek Film Festival (1994)
Central Florida Film and Video Festival 3rd Place (1994)
Best of Festival Award, New England Film and Video Festival (1994)
Grand Prize, Chicago International Gay Film and Video Festival (1994)

External links 

Official Site

References 

American documentary films
1993 films
1993 LGBT-related films
Documentary films about LGBT topics
American LGBT-related films
American road movies
1990s road movies
Culture of the Southern United States
Films directed by Ellen Spiro
1993 documentary films
1990s English-language films
1990s American films